Governor Pinckney may refer to:

Charles Pinckney (governor) (1757–1824), 37th Governor of South Carolina
Thomas Pinckney (1750–1828), 36th Governor of South Carolina